Christopher Bursk (born 1943)(died June 21, 2021)was an American poet, professor and activist. He is the author of nine poetry collections, including The First Inhabitants of Arcadia published by the (University of Arkansas Press (2006)), praised by The New York Times which said, "Bursk writes with verve and insight about child rearing, aging parents, sexuality, his literary heroes, the sexuality of his literary heroes."

Life 
Bursk was born in Cambridge, Massachusetts, and received a B.A. from Tufts University, an  MFA from Warren Wilson College and an MA and a PhD from Boston University. He lived in Langhorne Manor, Pennsylvania, and taught at Bucks County Community College. He and his wife, Mary Ann, have three children: Christian, Norabeth, and Justin.

His poems have been published in literary journals and magazines including Paris Review, The American Poetry Review and Manhattan Review, and in anthologies including The Mysterious Life of the Heart: Writing from The Sun About Passion, Longing, and Love (Sun Publishing Company, 2009), and Three new poets: Christopher Bursk, William Corbett, Paul Hannigan (Pym-Randall Press, 1966).

Awards 
Bursk's literary honors include fellowships from the National Endowment for the Arts, Pennsylvania Council on the Arts, 1995 Pew Foundation and Guggenheim Foundation. His awards include the Capricorn Poetry Award, the Green Rose Prize, Milton Kessler Poetry Book Award, the 49th Parallel Poetry Award and the Donald Hall Prize in Poetry. His humanitarian honors include the Bucks County Citizen of the Year award from Bucks County Community College, and the Bucks County Humanitarian of the Year award. His humanitarian activities have included working as a probation counselor, volunteering in a shelter for abused women and teaching poetry to prisoners at Bucks County Prison. He has been an advocate for the homeless and an organizer for farm workers’ rights.

Published works 
Full-length poetry collections
 "Dear Terror" (Read Furiously, 2020)
 "A Car Stops and a Door Opens" (CavanKerry Press, 2017)
 "Unthrifty Loveliness" (WordTech Communications, 2014)
 "Selected Poems" (FutureCycle Press, 2014)
 The First Inhabitants of Arcadia (University of Arkansas Press, 2006)
 The Improbable Swervings of Atoms (University of Pittsburgh Press, 2005)
 Ovid at Fifteen (New Issues Press, 2003)
 Cell Count (Texas Tech University Press, 1997)
 "The One True Religion" (Quarterly Review of Literature, 1997)
 The Way Water Rubs Stone (Word Works, 1988)
 Places of Comfort, Places of Justice (Humanities and Arts Press, 1987)
 Place of Residence (Sparrow Press, 1983)
 Standing Watch (Houghton Mifflin, 1978)

Chapbooks
 "The Boy With One Wing" (Finishing Line Press, 2013)
 Making Wings (State Street Press, 1983)
 "Little Harbor" (Quarterly Review of Literature, 1982)

References

Sources 
 Pennsylvania Center for the Book: Biographies - Christopher Bursk
 Christopher Bursk Listing, Poets & Writers Directory
 Library of Congress Online Catalog:  Christopher Bursk

External links 
 Christopher Bursk home page
 "Why Latin Should Still Be Taught in High School" by Christopher Bursk, www.poets.org
 "Your Father Sunbathing" by Christopher Bursk, www.poets.org
 "Foster Child" by Christopher Bursk, Standards, Vol. 7, No. 1
 "Ashes, Ashes We All Fall Down" by Christopher Bursk, The Sun, February 2008, Issue 386
 Joel Brouwer, Review of The First Inhabitants of Arcadia, The New York Times, April 23, 2006
 Marcus Smith, "Review of The First Inhabitants of Arcadia", Rattle, No. 27, Summer 2007
 The First Inhabitants of Arcadia by Christopher Bursk. Author page, University of Arkansas Press

American male poets
National Endowment for the Arts Fellows
Living people
Writers from Cambridge, Massachusetts
Poets from Massachusetts
Poets from Pennsylvania
Warren Wilson College alumni
Tufts University alumni
Boston University alumni
American educators
American activists
1943 births
People from Bucks County, Pennsylvania
Pew Fellows in the Arts